Radio the Universe is an upcoming action role-playing game developed and published by 6E6E6E. The game was originally funded via Kickstarter in 2012. The game has retro-styled 16-bit graphics, and takes place in a gothic cyberpunk setting, in which the female protagonist wakes up to find herself inside a "skyless and desolate labyrinth-city". Radio the Universe takes place within the city, as well as an area in the outer space beyond it called the Null Module.

Gameplay 

The game features top-down action RPG combat with an emphasis on open world exploration. The player can use both melee and ranged combat, and the player leaves behind their unspent experience points when they die in a similar manner to the Dark Souls games. These points can be spent to improve the character's attributes at upgrade stations. The game also contains boss battles, environmental hazards, and puzzles.

Plot 
The main character wakes up to find herself trapped, whether physically, spiritually, or both, within a tower that was long abandoned and taken over by mechanoid enemies.

Development 
The game was successfully funded on Kickstarter in 2012, exceeding its initial goal of US$12,000 and ultimately reaching a total of $81,719, enough to fulfill all stretch goals and greatly expand the scope of the game. Sixe, an indie developer based in Washington, D.C., credited Castlevania: Symphony of the Night, Hotline Miami, Dark Souls and Yume Nikki as inspirations for the game's design, also comparing the game to The Legend of Zelda and describing it as "dark science fiction".

While the game's original estimated release was in March 2014, the game passed several estimated release dates, including late 2016 and winter 2020, with development still ongoing.

Reception 
Tom Sykes of PC Gamer compared the game's aesthetics and gameplay to Hyper Light Drifter, calling it "gorgeous" and saying that he hoped that it was more "revelatory" than the aforementioned game. Jeffrey Matulef of Eurogamer called it "incredibly polished".

References 

Action role-playing video games
Cyberpunk video games
Gothic video games
Indie video games
Kickstarter-funded video games
Open-world video games
Post-apocalyptic video games
Retro-style video games
Single-player video games
Upcoming video games
Vaporware video games
Video games about robots
Video games developed in the United States
Video games featuring female protagonists
Video games set in outer space
Video games set in the future
Windows games